Mattersburg (formerly Mattersdorf, Croatian: Matrštof) is a town in Burgenland, Austria. It is the administrative center of the District of Mattersburg and was home to former Bundesliga football team, SV Mattersburg.

Location 
Mattersburg lies in the northern part of Burgenland, east of Wiener Neustadt in the Wulka River Valley, located in the rural region of the country.

To get to Mattersburg by road, either one takes Burgenland Highway S31 from Eisenstadt and Oberpullendorf or Mattersburg Highway S4 from Wiener Neustadt.

Mattersburg is connected by rail with Wiener Neustadt and Sopron by the Mattersburg Railway.

Mattersburg's two boroughs are Mattersburg and Walbersdorf.

History 
The site of Mattersburg was already populated in antiquity based on excavations of Roman and Longobard graveyards.
The town was first mentioned in writing as Villa Martini in 1202, when it became a property of the Nagymartoni family of Aragonese origin. Its Hungarian name (Nagymarton) also refers to the church consecrated to Martin of Tours. Originally the German name was Mattersdorf and was renamed to Mattersburg in 1924. Matter developed from Martin and also refers to St. Martin of Tours, while Dorf means "village" and Burg means "castle".

The area's original fortress had already been torn down by 1294. 
Mattersburg was elevated to the status of a market town in 1354. The town was destroyed by fire in the year 1774 and again in 1856. The area's wealth increased, when the railway began running from Wiener Neustadt to Mattersburg in 1847. During the 19th century, the town was the site of a ceramic manufacture founded by János Ziegler in 1815 or 1818, producing yellow coloured wares following the style of Viennese porcelain.

An interesting part of Mattersburg's history is the history of its Jewish minority, as the town was one of the Burgenland Siebengemeinden. The first Jews to settle in the town arrived in the 16th century, having been expelled from Sopron, and their presence in the town increased greatly over the following years. In 1671, the Jews were forced to abandon the town at the order of Leopold I. They were allowed to return to Mattersdorf, as it was then called, in 1678, although they were forced to buy back their own possessions. The self-governing Jewish community was first merged with the rest of the town in 1902/03.

Mattersburg belonged to the Kingdom of Hungary until 1920 and it was the seat of the Nagymarton district in Sopron county. In late 1918, Mattersburg locals rebelled against Hungarian rule to create the short-lived Republic of Heinzenland aimed at unifying with Austria. After the end of the First World War, German West-Hungary was given to Austria in the Treaties of St. Germain and Trianon; there it formed the new province of Burgenland. Mattersburg kept the official name of Mattersdorf until June 14, 1924; on July 2, 1926, it received town privileges.  In 1978, Mattersburg incorporated the town of Walbersdorf.

After the Anschluss in February 1938, the Jewish population of Mattersburg was expelled and dispossessed, so that already in the Fall of 1938, there were no more Jews in Mattersburg. In the course of the war, more than two hundred of the town's residents were missing or killed. Approximately one hundred of its Jewish residents were killed in the Holocaust.

Politics 
The Mayor of Mattersburg is Ingrid Salamon of the Social Democratic Party (SPÖ); there are two Vice-Mayors: the first is Klaus Leitgeb of the Austrian People's Party (ÖVP) and the second Josef Reisner of the SPÖ. The District Mayor of the Borough of Walbersdorf is Hubert Lang of the SPÖ and Johann Wallner is the Chief Officer.

Mattersburg's municipal council has 25 seats with party mandates as follows: 9 ÖVP, 14 SPÖ, 1 Freedom Party (FPÖ), 1 Grüne, other lists 0.

Sport 
Mattersburg, is home for former Austrian Bundesliga team, SV Mattersburg and home of the Sports table football Subbuteo team, TFC Mattersburg.

Economy 
One of the largest businesses in the area is the canned food maker Felix Austria.

Notable residents
 Pál Kitaibel, born here
 Áron Chorin, born in Bohemia, studied here
 Akiva Eger (aka Akiva Güns), born in Eisenstadt, studied here
 Akiva Ehrenfeld, Orthodox rabbi, born here
 Shmuel Ehrenfeld, the Mattersdorfer Rav, born here
 Moses Sofer, born in Germany, was a rabbi here
 Simcha Bunim of Peshischa, born in Poland, studied here
 Jeremiah Mattersdorf, served as Chief Rabbi

See also 
 Kiryat Mattersdorf
 Forchtenstein

References

External links 

  SV Mattersburg Official Site
  SV Mattersburg Fan Portal
  Pictures and Information about Mattersburg

Cities and towns in Mattersburg District
Mattersdorf
Holocaust locations in Austria